Billboard Women in Music is an annual event held by Billboard. Its main award is titled Woman of the Year, established to recognize "women in the music industry who have made significant contributions to the business and who, through their work and continued success, inspire generations of women to take on increasing responsibilities within the field", according to the magazine. Taylor Swift is the most awarded woman of the event, with three awards (two Woman of the Year awards and the Woman of the Decade award).
Women in music include women as composers, songwriters, instrumental performers, singers, conductors, music scholars, music educators, music critics/music journalists, and in other musical professions. A songwriter is an individual who writes the lyrics, melodies and chord progressions for songs, typically for a popular music genre such as pop, rock, or country music. A songwriter can also be called a composer, although the latter term tends to be mainly used for individuals from the classical music genre.

Woman of the Decade Award
Taylor Swift was honored with the first-ever Woman of the Decade Award, for being "one of the most accomplished musical artists of all time over the course of the 2010s".
 2010s: Taylor Swift (2019)

Woman of the Year Award
In 2007, Reba McEntire was honored with Billboards first Woman of the Year Award because of "her success as a recording artist, contributions to the business, and leadership in embracing the changing music business." Every year since then, Billboard has honored a female artist with the award. Taylor Swift is the first and only woman to be honored more than once. Billie Eilish is the youngest artist to ever be honored with the award. Cardi B became the first rapper to receive the accolade. The most recent winner is SZA. 
 2007: Reba McEntire
 2008: Ciara
 2009: Beyoncé
 2010: Fergie
 2011: Taylor Swift
 2012: Katy Perry
 2013: Pink
 2014: Taylor Swift
 2015: Lady Gaga
 2016: Madonna
 2017: Selena Gomez
 2018: Ariana Grande
 2019: Billie Eilish
 2020: Cardi B
 2022: Olivia Rodrigo
 2023: SZA

Rising Star Award
In 2008, Colbie Caillat was honored with Billboards first Rising Star award because of "her ascent in the pop charts and the repercussion that her music caused." Every year since then, Billboard has honored a female artist with the award.
 2008: Colbie Caillat
 2009: Lady Gaga
 2010: Jazmine Sullivan
 2011: Nicki Minaj
 2012: Carly Rae Jepsen
 2013: Janelle Monáe
 2014: Ariana Grande
 2015: Kelsea Ballerini
 2016: Halsey
 2017: Grace VanderWaal
 2018: Hayley Kiyoko
 2019: Rosalía
 2020: Chloe x Halle
 2023: Doechii

Triple Threat Award
In 2010, Lea Michele was honored with Billboards First-Ever Triple Threat Award because of her "excellence in performance across acting, singing and dancing."
 2010: Lea Michele

Rulebreaker Award
The Rulebreaker Award recognizes female artists who use their music and platform to defy traditional industry expectations and advance a powerful message for young people. Demi Lovato was the first to be honored with the award in 2015.
 2015: Demi Lovato
 2016: Alessia Cara
 2017: Kehlani
 2018: SZA
 2022: Karol G
 2023: Lainey Wilson

Trailblazer Award
The Trailblazer award is awarded to a female artist who acts as a music industry pioneer by using her platform to spotlight unheard voices and break ground for future generations of performers. Hayley Williams was the first to be honored for the award in 2014.
 2014: Hayley Williams
 2015: Lana Del Rey
 2016: Kesha
 2018: Janelle Monáe
 2019: Brandi Carlile
 2022: Phoebe Bridgers

Group of the Year
 2015: Fifth Harmony

Chart-Topper Award
 2014: Iggy Azalea
 2015: Selena Gomez
 2016: Meghan Trainor
 2022: Summer Walker

Icon Award
The Icon Award is given to a female artist of extraordinary accomplishment, who has made historic contributions to the industry and artistry.
 2008: Debbie Harry
 2014: Aretha Franklin
 2016: Shania Twain
 2017: Mary J. Blige
 2018: Cyndi Lauper
 2019: Alanis Morissette
 2020: Jennifer Lopez
 2022: Bonnie Raitt
 2023: Ivy Queen

Impact Award
The Impact Award was given for the first time to Solange Knowles because she "uses her voice to empower and develop new leaders of tomorrow through their on-air persona, platform, and philanthropic efforts to inspire social change across the masses".
 2017: Solange Knowles
 2019: Alicia Keys
 2020: Jessie Reyez
 2022: H.E.R.
 2023: Becky G

Legend Award
 2015: Loretta Lynn

Breakthrough Artist
 2014: Idina Menzel
 2015: Tori Kelly
 2016: Maren Morris
 2017: Camila Cabello
 2023: TWICE

Hitmaker Award
The Hitmaker Award is given to the songwriter whose compositions have significantly impacted culture.
 2014: Charli XCX
 2020: Dolly Parton

Innovator Award
The Innovator Award recognizes female artists who challenge musical convention, create positive change and contribute new ideas both in and outside of their creative work.
 2015: Missy Elliott
 2018: Kacey Musgraves

Powerhouse Award
The Powerhouse Award is given to the act whose music dominated in their respected year through streaming, sales, and radio.
 2014: Jessie J
 2015: Brittany Howard
 2016: Andra Day
 2017: Kelly Clarkson
 2019: Megan Thee Stallion
 2020: Dua Lipa
 2022: Doja Cat
 2023: Latto

Game Changer Award
The Game Changer Award was given for the first time to Nicki Minaj after becoming the first woman to notch 100 appearances on the Billboard Hot 100 chart.
 2019: Nicki Minaj
 2022: Saweetie

Visionary Award
Lana Del Rey was awarded with first visionary award in Billboard's history.

 2023: Lana Del Rey

Executives of the Year
 2015: Emma Banks, Carol Kinzel, Marlene Tsuchii, Sara Newkirk Simon, Samantha Kirby Yoh, Natalia Nastaskin, Marsha Vlasic, Caroline Yim, Marcie Allen, Jennifer Breithaupt, Debra Curtis, Sara Clemens, Tamara Hrivnak, Vivien Lewis, Heather Moosnick, Katie Schlosser, Monica Escobedo, Julie Gurovitsch, Lindsay Shookus, Debra Lee, Sarah Moll, Brittany Schreiber, Dawn Soler, Lia Vollack, Lori Badgett, Martha Henderson, Julie Boos, Mary Ann McCready, Michele Anthony, Candace Berry, Maria Fernandez, Wendy Goldstein, Julie Greenwald, Ethiopia Habtemariam, Allison Jones, Michelle Jubelirer, Cindy Mabe, Sylvia Rhone, Brenda Romano, Jacqueline Saturn, Julie Swidler, Dana DuFine, Maureen Ford, Amy Howe, Ali Harnell, Debra Rathwell, Kathy Willard, Lee Ann Callahan-Longo, Allison Kaye, Sarah Stennett, Ty Stiklorius, Elizabeth Matthews, Ann Sweeney, Kelli Turner, Jody Gerson, Jennifer Knoepfle, Carianne Marshall, Sas Metcalfe, Katie Vinten, Jess Besack, Sharon Dastur, Anya Grundmann  
 2016: Bozoma Saint John, Julie Greenwald, Camille Hackney 
 2017: Julie Greenwald
 2018: Danielle Aguirre, Jacqueline Charlesworth, Susan Genco, and Dina LaPolt
 2019: Desiree Perez 
 2020: Brianna Agyemang & Jamila Thomas
 2021: Golnar Khosrowshahi

Women of the Year in Music
 2018 Women of the Year in Music 
Latrice Burnett, Jennifer Hirsch-Davis - Island Records
Nicki Farag - Def Jam Records
Lori Feldman, Hildi Snodgrass - Warner Bros. Records
Maria Fernandez - Sony Music Latin
Andrea Ganis, Camille Hackney, Julliette Jones - Atlantic Records
Wendy Goldstein, Sharon Dastur, Katina Bynum, Kerri Mackar - Republic Records
Ethiopia Habtemariam - Motown Records
Allison Jones - Big Machine Label Group
Celine Joshua, Jennifer Baltimore, Elsa Yep - Universal Music Group
Michelle Jubelirer - Capitol Music Group
Sasha Junk - Kidz Bop
Cris Lacy, Taylor Lindsey - Warner Music Nashville
Cindy Mabe - Universal Music Nashville
Jennifer Mallory - Columbia Records
Sylvia Rhone, Traci Adams - Epic Records
Brenda Romano, Annie Lee, Nicole Wyskoarko, Erika Savage -Interscope Geffen A&M
Julie Swidler, Deirdre McDonald, Jennifer Fowler - Sony Music Entertainment
Carolyn Williams, Camille Yorrick - RCA Records
Desiree Perez - Roc Nation
Dia Simms - Combs Enterprises
Sarah Stennett - First Access Entertainment
Ama Walton - BMG,
Dana DuFine, Debra Rathwell, Brooke Michael Kain - AEG
Amy Howe - Ticketmaster North America
Kate McMahon, Sara Winter-Banks - Messina Touring Group
Kathy Willard, Heather Parry, Maureen Ford, Tara Traub - Live Nation Entertainment
Emma Banks, Marlene Tsuchii, Carole Kinzel, Caroline Yim - Creative Artists Agency
Natalia Nastaskin, Cheryl Paglierani - United Talent Agency
Yves C. Pierre, Jacqueline Reynolds-Drumm - ICM Partners

Producer of the Year
Rosalía was honored with the first ever Producer of the Year award in 2023.

• 2023: Rosalía

Notes

References 

Awards established in 2006
2006 establishments in the United States
Billboard awards
Music awards honoring women